Bache is an unincorporated community in Pittsburg County, Oklahoma, United States.

A post office was established at Bache, Indian Territory on February 26, 1903. It closed on July 29, 1995. 

At the time of its founding, the community was located in the Moshulatubbee District of the Choctaw Nation.  The community was named for mining operator Franklin Bache.

Demographics

References

Unincorporated communities in Pittsburg County, Oklahoma
Unincorporated communities in Oklahoma